Lee Tae-sung (born 1978) is a South Korean businessman. He is Co-CEO of SeAH Holdings, a Korean mid-size steel conglomerate, since 2018. Lee is also chairman of the board and Vice President at SeAH Besteel, a major affiliate of the group.

After his father and late chairman Lee Woon-Hyung died in 2013, he is the largest shareholder in SeAH Holdings, owning a 44.5% of stake.

Biography

Early life and education 
Lee Tae-sung was born on August 11, 1978, in Seoul. He is the eldest son of late SeAH Group Chairman Lee Woon-Hyung and grandson the corporation's founder Lee Jong-deok. This makes him a third-generation descendant of the conglomerate. In 2000, he majored in psychology and journalism at the University of Michigan and received an MBA from the Business School of Tsinghua. Before he started his business career, completed his military service as an active-duty soldier in the ROK Army.

Career 
Lee started working at SeAH Japan in 2006, and became Head of Strategic Planning at SeAH Holdings in 2009. When his father, chairman Woon-Hyung Lee died in 2013, Lee Tae-sung inherited his father's shares in SeAH Holdings and SeAH Steel and became the group's largest shareholder. The following year he was promoted as CEO and Head of Strategic Planning for SeAH Besteel Corporation. Four years later, at age 42, took over as CEO of SeAH Holdings Corp., not without controversy.

Lee Tae-sung has established international branches including America, Germany, Thailand and India in order to diversify and secure the family business.

Personal life 
He is married Chai Moon-sun, daughter of Aekyung Group's vice chairman Chai Hyung-seok.

Positions

References 

Living people
University of Michigan alumni
South Korean businesspeople
People from Seoul
1978 births
Tsinghua University alumni